What I'm For is the fifth studio album by American country music artist Pat Green. It was released on January 27, 2009 (see 2009 in country music) on BNA Records, and produced by Dann Huff. The album is his second for BNA, and his eighth overall. Lead-off single "Let Me" has charted in the Top 20 on the Hot Country Songs chart, peaking at No. 12.

Content
The first single release from the album is "Let Me". This song is his thirteenth chart entry on the Hot Country Songs charts, peaking at No. 12 in February 2009 and becoming his second-highest peak on that chart. Following this song is "Country Star", which was released in March 2009. "Country Star" was withdrawn as a single in May 2009 and "What I'm For" subsequently became the third single release.

Also included on this album is a re-recording of "Carry On", which was originally released on his 2000 album Carry On and later released as a single from his 2001 album Three Days. Green co-wrote eight of the ten songs on this album.

Track listing

Personnel
As listed in liner notes.

 Tim Akers – accordion, Hammond B-3 organ, keyboards
 Brendon Anthony – fiddle
 J. T. Corenflos – electric guitar
 Clay Corn – keyboards
 Chad Cromwell – drums
 Brett Danaher – electric guitar
 Eric Darken – percussion
 Dan Dugmore – steel guitar
 Jay DeMarcus – bass guitar
 Shannon Forrest – drums
 Paul Franklin – steel guitar
 Pat Green – lead vocals, background vocals, acoustic guitar
 Dann Huff – electric guitar
 Charlie Judge – keyboards
 Chris McHugh – drums
 Jerry McPherson – electric guitar
 Justin Andrew Pollard – drums
 Adam Shoenfeld – electric guitar
 Chris Skrobot – electric guitar
 Jimmie Lee Sloas – bass guitar
 Michael Taraby – bass guitar
 Russell Terrell – background vocals
 Ilya Toshinsky – acoustic guitar
 Glenn Worf – bass guitar
 Jonathan Yudkin – fiddle, mandolin

Chart performance

Album

References

2009 albums
Albums produced by Dann Huff
Pat Green albums
BNA Records albums